Joseph Staton (March 8, 1948 – June 20, 2022) was an American professional baseball player. A first baseman, he appeared in 15 games with 19 official at bats for the Detroit Tigers of Major League Baseball during the 1972 and 1973 seasons.

Signed by Detroit as a non-drafted, amateur free agent in 1970, Staton played for five seasons in the Tiger farm system, batting .301 in 518 career games. He was recalled by the Tigers in September 1972 and got into six games as a pinch runner and late-inning defensive replacement at first base. In 1973, again during a September tryout, he appeared in nine games, starting three, and collected his four Major League hits, all singles. He retired from baseball after the 1974 minor league season.

References

External links

1948 births
2022 deaths
African-American baseball players
Baseball players from Seattle
Detroit Tigers players
Lakeland Tigers players
Major League Baseball first basemen
Montgomery Rebels players
Rocky Mount Leafs players
Toledo Mud Hens players